is a railway station in the city of Tōkai, Aichi Prefecture, Japan, operated by Meitetsu.

Lines

Station layout
The station has two opposed side platforms, with the station building underneath. The station has automated ticket machines, Manaca automated turnstiles and is staffed.

Platforms

Adjacent stations

Station history
Owari Yokosuka Station was opened on February 18, 1912 as a station on the Aichi Electric Railway Company. The Aichi Electric Railway became part of the Meitetsu group on August 1, 1935. The station was relocated to its present address in March 1990, and work to elevate the tracks was completed in November 2002.

Passenger statistics
In fiscal 2017, the station was used by an average of 5472 passengers daily.

Surrounding area
 Seijoh University.

See also
 List of Railway Stations in Japan

References

External links

  

Railway stations in Aichi Prefecture
Railway stations in Japan opened in 1912
Stations of Nagoya Railroad
Tōkai, Aichi